The Jamaican Permanent Representative to the United Nations in New York City is the official representative of the Government in Kingston, Jamaica to the Headquarters of the United Nations.

History 
On  Jamaica was admitted to the United Nations.

List of representatives

References 

 
United Nations
Jamaica